Baldovce is a village and municipality in Levoča District in the Prešov Region of central-eastern Slovakia.
In historical records the village was first mentioned in 1272.
The municipality lies at an altitude of 430 metres and covers an area of   (2020-06-30/-07-01).

Population 
It has a population of 169 people (2020-12-31).

Genealogical resources

The records for genealogical research are available at the state archive "Statny Archiv in Levoca, Slovakia"

 Roman Catholic church records (births/marriages/deaths): 1653-1895
 Greek Catholic church records (births/marriages/deaths): 1825-1950
 Census records 1869 of Baldovce are available at the state archive.

See also
 List of municipalities and towns in Slovakia

References

External links
https://web.archive.org/web/20100202015957/http://www.statistics.sk/mosmis/eng/run.html
Surnames of living people in Baldovce

Villages and municipalities in Levoča District
Spiš